The basketball tournaments of UAAP Season 69 started on July 8, 2006 at the Araneta Coliseum and ended on October 2, 2006 also at the same venue with the UST Growling Tigers defeating the Ateneo Blue Eagles in the third game of their Finals series.

The Ateneo Blue Eaglets triumphed over the FEU-FERN Baby Tamaraws to win the Juniors' championship, while the UST Tigresses won over the FEU Lady Tamaraws in the Women's Championship. In the Men's championship, the UST Growling Tigers rallied in the Finals series to beat the Ateneo Blue Eagles, 2 games to 1 to win their 19th basketball championship. Kenneth Bono of the Adamson Soaring Falcons, Bacon Austria of Ateneo and Cassy Tioseco of Ateneo won the Most Valuable Player awards.

Men's tournament

Elimination round

Rivalry games
These are the results of the different rivalry games:

Third–seed playoff

Bracket

Semifinals
In the semifinals, the higher seed has the twice-to-beat advantage, where they only have to win once, while their opponents twice, to progress.

Ateneo vs. Adamson
The Ateneo Blue Eagles has the twice-to-beat advantage.

UE vs. UST
The UE Red Warriors has the twice-to-beat advantage.

Finals

Finals Most Valuable Player:

Awards

Most Valuable Player: 
Rookie of the Year: 
Mythical Team:
Guard: 
Guard: 
Forward: 
Forward: 
Center: 
Gilette Breakout Player: 
PSBank Maasahan (Dependable) Player: 
Coach of the Year: 
Player of the Year: 
Scoring Champion: 
Mr. Clutch: 
Defensive Player: 
Sixth Man: 
Comeback Player: 
Most Improved Player: 
Sportsmanship Award: 
Energy Player:

Statistical leaders
 Points: Kenneth Bono (Adamson, 21.8)
 Rebounds: Jervy Cruz (UST, 12.8)
 Assists: Japs Cuan (UST, 6.3)
 Blocks: Elmer Espiritu (UE, 2.1)
 Steals: Marvin Cruz (UP, 2.0)
 Turnovers: Bonbon Custodio (UE, 4.3)

Suspensions
 Jonathan Jankhe of the NU Bulldogs for shoving a closed fist against Vicmel Epres of the UP Fighting Maroons. Served one-game suspension against, ironically, the same team.
 Jojo Duncil of the UST Growling Tigers for headbutting Dave Catamora of the NU Bulldogs. Served one-game suspension against the Adamson Soaring Falcons.
 Ira Buyco of the UP Fighting Maroons for hitting Macky Escalona of the Ateneo Blue Eagles in the face on a rebound play. Served one-game suspension against the Adamson Soaring Falcons.
 UE suspended Bonifacio Custodio of the UE Red Warriors for disciplinary action. Served suspension on Game 2 of the semifinals against the UST Growling Tigers.
 Anthony Espiritu of the UST Growling Tigers was supposedly suspended on Game 3 of the Finals due to two flagrant fouls on Game 2 but was instead given a warning by the UAAP Board.

Women's tournament

Elimination round

Second–seed playoff

Bracket

Semifinals
In the semifinals, the higher seed has the twice-to-beat advantage, where they only have to win once, while their opponents twice, to progress.

UST vs. UP
The UST Tigresses has the twice-to-beat advantage.

FEU vs. Ateneo
The FEU Lady Tamaraws had the twice-to-beat advantage after beating the Ateneo Lady Eagles for the second-seed, which led to a virtual best-of-three playoff series.

Finals

Awards

Most Valuable Player: 
Rookie of the Year: 
Mythical Five:

Juniors' tournament

Elimination round

Bracket

Stepladder semifinals

First round
This is a one-game playoff.

Second round
FEU-FERN has the twice-to-beat advantage, where they only have to win once, while their opponents twice, to progress.

Finals
This is a best-of-three playoff.

Finals Most Valuable Player:

Awards

Most Valuable Player: 
Rookie of the Year: 
Mythical Five:

See also 

 NCAA Season 82 basketball tournaments

References

External links
 Official UAAP website
 UAAP Basketball at UBelt.com: Men's | Women's | Juniors'

69
2006–07 in Philippine basketball
Basket